Jazeerat Al-Feel Sports Club is a Sudanese football club based in Wad Madani. They played in the top division in Sudanese football, Sudan Premier League. Their home stadium is Stade Wad Medani.

References

External links
 Team profile – soccerway.com

Football clubs in Sudan
Al Jazirah (state)
1936 establishments in Sudan